Rappard is a surname. It may refer to:

Anthon van Rappard (1858–1892), Dutch painter and draughtsman
Dora Rappard (1842–1923), Swiss missionary and hymn writer
Ernst Herman van Rappard (1899–1953), Dutch National Socialist and anti-Semite
Frederik van Rappard (1798–1862), Dutch politician
Fritz-Georg von Rappard (1892–1946), German Nazi general during World War II executed for war crimes 
Harry van Rappard (1897–1982), Dutch sprinter
Oscar van Rappard (1896–1962), Dutch track and field athlete and soccer player
Josias Cornelis Rappard (1824–1898), Dutch soldier and artist
William Rappard (1883–1958), American academic and diplomat

It may also refer to

Centre William Rappard, Geneva, Switzerland, built between 1923 and 1926 to house the International Labour Office